Dzur may refer to:

Martin Dzúr (1919–1985), Czechoslovak defense minister from 1968 to 1985
Walter Dzur (1919–1999), German international football player
Dzur (novel), by Steven Brust